Christ Church, Cinderhill is a Grade II listed parish church in the Church of England in Radford, Nottingham.

History

The church dates from 1856 and was constructed as a chapel of ease to St. Leodegarius Church, Basford. It was consecrated on 19 June 1856 by Rt. Revd. John Jackson, Bishop of Lincoln. The choir vestry was added in 1902.

The church was built for the miners of John Thomas North’s colliery at Babbington. Thomas Chambers Hine designed the church. The first chaplains were appointed when Cinderhill become a separate District in 1896. In 1929 Christ Church, Cinderhill's official name was changed to ‘The District Chapelry of Christ Church Cinderhill’. The Bishop of Southwell was the Patron.

References

Cinderhill
Grade II listed churches in Nottinghamshire
Churches in Nottingham
Churches completed in 1856
Thomas Chambers Hine buildings